Kishinouyei is a New Latin adjective referring to Japanese marine biologist Kamakichi Kishinouye (1867–1929).

See also
 Including organisms with species name "Kishinouyei"

Japanese-language surnames